Krupuk usek or Krupuk tanah or soil cracker, is a snack made of a certain type of fine-grain clay mixed with sago flour. To add flavorings, salt and garlic may be added. It comes molded as various shapes and forms— from round, square, to webbed-circle form.

Krupuk tanah is usually in purple hue, and can be found at traditional markets in Pekalongan, Java, Indonesia, especially in the town of Weleri.

Indonesian cuisine